Agatupu Rodney Anoai (October 2, 1966 – October 23, 2000) was an American professional wrestler. He was best known for his time with the World Wrestling Federation (WWF), where he wrestled under the ring name Yokozuna, a reference to the highest rank in professional sumo wrestling in Japan. He was a two-time world champion.

Although the Yokozuna character was portrayed as a champion sumo wrestler, Anoai never competed as an actual sumotori. Though he wrestled as a representative of Japan, in real life he was a Samoan American and was accordingly billed as hailing from Polynesia. However, he was managed by the Japanese character Mr. Fuji (in reality a Japanese American) who would follow Anoai to the ring with a wooden bucket of salt while waving a Japanese flag.

In the WWF, Anoai was a two-time WWF World Heavyweight Champion and two-time WWF Tag Team Champion (with Owen Hart), as well as the winner of the 1993 Royal Rumble. He was the first wrestler of Samoan descent to hold the WWF World Heavyweight Championship, as well as the first Royal Rumble winner who (as a result of a direct stipulation) received a WWF world championship title shot at WrestleMania. He defeated WWE Hall of Famers Bret Hart and Hulk Hogan, in consecutive pay-per-view victories in the main event of WrestleMania IX and the 1993 King of the Ring, to win his two WWF World Heavyweight Championships, and also headlined WrestleMania X against Hart. He was the third-fastest newcomer (after Brock Lesnar and Sheamus) to win the WWF/E Championship after his debut. He was posthumously inducted into the WWE Hall of Fame in 2012.

Professional wrestling career

Early career (1984–1992) 
Anoai's career in professional wrestling began as he grew up in a family full of wrestlers, the Anoaʻi family. His uncles were The Wild Samoans, Afa and Sika, who trained him from an early age in the family business. Anoaʻi took on the name of the "Great Kokina" while wrestling overseas in Japan. He also spent some time in Mexico, learning the craft and gaining the experience necessary to be a star in the sport. He made a one-off appearance for Jim Crockett Promotions on August 12, 1987, facing Ron Simmons at a house show. His first major exposure in the United States came in the American Wrestling Association (AWA) as "Kokina Maximus". Wrestling as a Samoan superstar, he was managed by Sheik Adnan El Kassey. He was billed as the biggest Samoan wrestler ever and given credit for breaking Greg Gagne's leg and ending his career.

World Wrestling Federation (1992–1998)

WWF Champion (1992–1994) 
In 1992, Anoai was contacted by Vince McMahon of the World Wrestling Federation (WWF) and offered a roster spot along with The Samoans (Fatu and Samoan Savage). On an August 17, 1992, episode of Prime Time Wrestling the Samoans (soon to be the Headshrinkers) made their debut. Commentator Gorilla Monsoon made mention of another, larger Samoan that they would soon be seeing in the WWF. Anoa'i would make his initial debut as Kokina in an untelevised match on September 1, 1992, at a WWF Superstars taping in Hershey, Pennsylvania. Wrestling as Kokina, he defeated Ron Neal. This would be the only time that Anoa'i wrestled under his former gimmick. Shortly after he was offered a new gimmick: Yokozuna.

Managed by Mr. Fuji, Yokozuna debuted on the October 31, 1992 edition of Superstars with his then new gimmick of a stereotypical sumo wrestler, who competed under the Japanese flag; though the WWF tactfully acknowledged his Samoan roots. He wore a mawashi as part of his ring attire, but wore long tights underneath the loincloth, something that Vince McMahon and Yokozuna's own cousin Rikishi later felt wasn't needed and that he should've worn the traditional mawashi without the tights to expose his buttocks. (Something Rikishi himself would later do.) He made his pay-per-view debut at Survivor Series, easily defeating the much smaller Virgil with his huge weight advantage. Yokozuna's career soon took off, and he headed into 1993's Royal Rumble, where he was billed as a potential favorite. He eliminated Randy Savage to win the Royal Rumble match, cementing his movement towards main event status. Yokozuna was a competitor in the first-ever match in Monday Night Raw history, defeating the much smaller Koko B. Ware with his signature finisher, the Banzai Drop. Soon after, Yokozuna was challenged by American patriot "Hacksaw" Jim Duggan, who aimed to be the first man who could knock Yokozuna off his feet (this was taped before Randy Savage knocked down Yokozuna at the Royal Rumble). On the February 6, 1993, airing of Superstars, Duggan succeeded in knocking Yokozuna down, only for Yokozuna to then sneak attack Duggan with a bucket of salt Mr. Fuji had brought to the ring, and crush him with four Banzai Drops, the fourth being with the American flag draped over Duggan. Afterwards, Duggan was suffering from (kayfabe) internal bleeding. On the May 10, 1993, edition of Monday Night Raw, Yokozuna served as one of the lumberjacks in a match between Duggan and Shawn Michaels for the Intercontinental Championship. Duggan, upon seeing Yokozuna, immediately charged at him and knocked him off his feet again; late in the match, after Bam Bam Bigelow distracted Duggan, Michaels attacked the challenger from behind and threw him out of the ring to where Yokozuna was standing. Yokozuna knocked Duggan to the floor and nailed him with a leg drop, then rolled his unconscious body back into the ring as payback for the earlier attack.

At WrestleMania IX, Yokozuna wrestled against Bret Hart for the WWF Championship. Hart had the match won with Yokozuna about to submit to the Sharpshooter, when Mr. Fuji threw salt into the champion's face. Blinded, Hart was then pinned by Yokozuna, who won the WWF Championship. As he and Mr. Fuji celebrated, Hulk Hogan came to the ring to help Hart and was challenged by Mr Fuji to take on the champion for his newly won crown. After Fuji accidentally threw salt in Yokozuna's eyes, Hogan came through with the win and captured his fifth WWF Championship. At the time, Yokozuna held the record for the second shortest time (after Ric Flair) to win the WWF Championship after his debut, with 173 days (currently, Yokozuna holds the fourth shortest time, after Flair, Sheamus and Brock Lesnar). Hogan seemed to have the match won, but a photographer, planted at ringside among a legitimate Japanese wrestling press group, shot a blast of fire into Hogan's face. This allowed Yokozuna to take Hogan out with a leg drop and regain the WWF Championship, after which Yokozuna proceeded to hit Hogan with the Banzai Drop in the corner. Soon after, Hogan left the WWF to pursue other interests, which left Yokozuna and Fuji to claim that they had ended "Hulkamania" (to wit, that would be Hogan's last appearance in the WWF for nine years). Many wrestlers and athletes alike tried to slam Yokozuna, with no success. As Yokozuna thought that there would be no one left to challenge him, Lex Luger flew in by helicopter, stepped forward, and slammed him on the deck. Commentator Bobby Heenan claimed Luger's move was a hiptoss, not a bodyslam, as Yokozuna was running at Luger, but the slam was ruled legitimate. This made Luger the next major challenger to Yokozuna's title.

Luger took control late in the match, scoring on Yokozuna with a bodyslam and flying forearm. Luger had metal plates put into his arm following an injury from a motorcycle accident, making it a formidable weapon (it was stipulated that Luger had to wear a protective pad over it, but it was torn off in the course of the match) and Yokozuna was knocked out of the ring, unconscious, and lost via count-out. The title did not change hands, but the match's result made it seem like Luger had a chance against his gigantic foe. The contract Luger had signed for the match, as orchestrated by Yokozuna's new spokesman and advisor James E. Cornette, stated that if he did not win the championship, he would not get another shot at the title. Yokozuna and Luger continued to feud until Survivor Series, where each chose a team of allies for an elimination match. The match was billed as an All-Americans (Lex Luger, The Undertaker and Steiner Brothers) vs. Foreign Fanatics (Yokozuna, Quebecer Jacques, Ludvig Borga and Crush) contest.

Yokozuna's next challenger was The Undertaker. The two first squared off against each other as parts of their respective teams at Survivor Series. Prior to the match starting, the two stood nose-to-nose as a tease to the crowd as to the possibility of those two facing each other. The Undertaker, however, was not tagged into the match until after it was just him and Luger on the American Team. When the Undertaker entered, he beat down on Ludvig Borga but was knocked down by Yokozuna. Yokozuna then gave the Undertaker a Banzai Drop, but the Undertaker sat up when Yokozuna went for a second Banzai Drop. The two then brawled
outside, where Yokozuna seemed to be completely over-matched. They were both eliminated by double-count-out. Eventually, Yokozuna was forced to accept a Casket match with the Undertaker. The match occurred at Royal Rumble, where all the odds looked to be in the Undertaker's favor. However, after a lengthy match, Mr. Fuji called out the troops, bringing a dozen heel wrestlers out to aid Yokozuna in attacking the Undertaker. After a lot of struggle (as well as damaging the Undertaker's "magic" urn), the group managed to shove the Undertaker into the casket, giving the win to Yokozuna. As they celebrated afterwards, however, a mysterious figure appeared on the Titantron, looking like the Undertaker inside the casket. He opened his eyes and said the Undertaker would not rest in peace; he then disappeared in a smoke and light show, rising to the top of the Titantron and seemingly levitating all the way to the arena ceiling. He then vanished. This storyline was used to allow the Undertaker to rest for several months to recover from lingering real-life injuries.

In the 1994 Royal Rumble match, the last two competitors, Lex Luger and Bret Hart, fought and eliminated each other simultaneously. Since the winner of the Royal Rumble was to become the number one contender to Yokozuna's title, it was decided that both wrestlers would get a shot at the title at WrestleMania X. By virtue of winning a coin toss, Luger got to wrestle Yokozuna first at the event. The winner of that match would go on to face Bret Hart later in the evening with the title on the line. To obviate the risk of outside interference, both title matches were scheduled to have special guest referees. Mr. Perfect was the special guest referee for the Luger/Yokozuna bout. Luger seemed to have the match well in hand and had knocked out Yokozuna with a running forearm smash in the middle of the ring. He also knocked out Mr. Fuji and Jim Cornette, who tried to enter the ring. However, when Luger went for the pin, Perfect occupied himself with the unconscious Fuji and Cornette who were still lying on the ring apron. When Luger got angry and pushed Mr. Perfect, he was disqualified, thus making Yokozuna the first villainous champion to successfully defend the WWF Championship at a WrestleMania. Later in the night, Yokozuna defended the championship again, this time against the former champion Bret "Hitman" Hart, who had lost earlier in the night to his brother Owen Hart. For this match, Roddy Piper was the special referee. When Cornette tried to interfere to break a pinfall, Piper decked him. At the end of the match, Yokozuna seemed ready to hit his finishing maneuver, the Banzai Drop, when he lost his balance and took a fall from the ropes. Hart got the pinfall victory, finally taking the title away from the long-running champion who reigned for 280 days. Afterwards on television, Cornette would blame the fall on a concussion suffered from Luger's forearm plate.

After dropping the belt, Yokozuna's main event status began to fade away. He briefly tagged with Crush, another Mr. Fuji charge. In May 1994, on a Monday Night Raw episode, Yokozuna was challenged by Earthquake to an actual sumo match. On May 16, 1994, Earthquake beat Yokozuna in the only (worked) sumo match until WrestleMania 21, between The Big Show and an actual yokozuna, Akebono. At King of the Ring 1994, Yokozuna and Crush failed to win the WWF Tag Team Championship from The Headshrinkers (Samu and Fatu). Yokozuna then had to deal with the "rebirth" of the Undertaker, who immediately came after the foe who had taken him out of action. The two met in another casket match at the Survivor Series, this time with actor/karate expert Chuck Norris as the special enforcer to keep the other heel wrestlers away from ringside. Without their help (although Irwin R. Schyster did successfully interfere on Yokozuna's behalf), Yokozuna could not win and eventually ended up locked inside the casket. Yokozuna continued to wrestle briefly before taking some time off to increase his already huge weight advantage.

Teaming with Owen Hart and departure (1995–1998) 

In April 1995, Owen Hart began promising that he would have a great tag team partner to face off against The Smoking Gunns (Billy and Bart) at WrestleMania XI for the WWF Tag Team Championship. Following the match, Jim Cornette stated, "Michael Jordan's back and so is Yokozuna", in reference to Jordan's first return to the NBA. The two would remain champions for several months, defending against teams like the Allied Powers (Lex Luger and Davey Boy Smith), the Smoking Gunns, and others.

At In Your House 3 on September 24, 1995, Yokozuna teamed up with Davey Boy Smith to take on Shawn Michaels and Diesel (the back story being that Hart was with his wife as she gave birth to one of their children) with Diesel's WWF Championship, Shawn Michaels' Intercontinental Championship and Hart and Yokozuna's Tag Team Championship on the line. During the match, Hart came to the ring, only to be pinned by Diesel. The next day, due to protests from the team and the legal help of Clarence Mason, President Gorilla Monsoon reluctantly returned the belts to Yokozuna and Hart, since Hart was not an official part of the match. Their second reign was shorter, as the Smoking Gunns defeated them that night for the belts.

He competed in the 1996 Royal Rumble match, managing to eliminate Bob Backlund, King Mabel, and Swat Team member #2 before being tossed out by Shawn Michaels, the eventual winner. Although Cornette had tried to make peace between him and new acquisition Vader, many observers felt Yokozuna was being relegated. After several run-ins, Yokozuna left Cornette and began a short stint as a fan favorite. He spoke English to the fans, had Mr. Fuji wave an American flag during his matches, and challenged Vader to numerous matches. It was during this feud that Yokozuna teamed up with Ahmed Johnson and Jake Roberts in a six-man tag-team match at WrestleMania XII, facing off with Vader, Owen Hart and British Bulldog. The feud took a painful turn a couple weeks later (April 8), when Vader jumped on Yokozuna's leg, (kayfabe) breaking it. The splash was shown on television as a leg break, in reality it was performed to allow Yokozuna to take some time off to lose weight. However, instead of a stretcher, a real forklift had to be brought to carry Yokozuna out on that edition of RAW. It was the only way to move a man of Yokozuna's size.

Yokozuna returned at In Your House 8: Beware of Dog to wrestle Vader. During the event, a severe thunderstorm in the area caused the pay-per-view broadcast feed to blackout. In one of the matches not broadcast, Yokozuna defeated Vader. The event was rescheduled two days later, in which the matches that were previously blacked-out took place again. In the rematch, Vader defeated Yokozuna. He appeared at Free for All just before SummerSlam, facing off against Stone Cold Steve Austin. Yokozuna took the advantage near the end of the match, but when he went for the Banzai Drop, the rope broke under his weight, sending him crashing back down. Austin attained the victory.

The next night on Raw, Yokozuna faced then WWF Champion Shawn Michaels for the title, teasing turning heel again. Despite using his big size, Yokozuna lost the match to Michaels. He made his final WWF appearance at the 1996 Survivor Series, still going after Vader, however he only briefly entered the match illegally and it ended with all remaining wrestlers being disqualified. For a second time, Yokozuna went to his home in Los Angeles to lose weight through exercise and dieting, being replaced by other wrestlers on a late November tour of the United Kingdom. Despite dropping a reported , he still could not lose enough to satisfy the WWF officials, and was not medically cleared to wrestle in some states because of his physical condition. Yokozuna was unable to pass a physical required for professional wrestlers by the New York State Athletic Commission. There was an idea for him to return in 1997 and join The Hart Foundation, but it never happened.

Yokozuna was officially released from the WWF in May 1998, a decision that came directly from Vince McMahon due to his weight issues. Jim Ross later commented that Yokozuna knew the release was coming and that it was also due to potential heart issues related to his weight and, following the unexpected death of Brian Pillman seven months previously due to an undiagnosed heart issue, the WWF didn't want to take the liability of letting Yokozuna perform with heart issues.

Independent circuit (1998–2000) 
After his WWF career ended, he performed for various independent promotions. In 1998, he wrestled for Maryland Championship Wrestling. The last major appearance for Yokozuna was at October 1999's Heroes of Wrestling pay-per-view. At an estimated 760 lb (345 kg), he had not only gained the weight that he had lost, but admitted he was intentionally getting bigger, with a goal weight between 850 (386 kg) and 900 lb (408 kg), so that he would set a new record for the heaviest professional wrestler ever. At the pay-per-view event, Yokozuna was scheduled to take on King Kong Bundy in one of the event's two featured matches. However, Jake Roberts, who was scheduled to face Jim Neidhart in the other main event match, came to the ring for his match intoxicated and in no condition to wrestle. The promoters made a last-minute change and ordered Yokozuna to team with Roberts against Bundy and Neidhart, and Yokozuna's team lost.

Personal life 
Anoai was a member of the Anoaʻi wrestling family: Roman Reigns, Rikishi, Samu, Rosey, Manu, Umaga, and The Rock were among his cousins, The Usos were his first cousins once-removed and Afa and Sika were his uncles. He had two children, Justin and Keilani.

Death 
On October 23, 2000, three weeks after his 34th birthday,  Anoai died from pulmonary edema in his room at the Moat House Hotel on Paradise Street in Liverpool while on a wrestling tour of the UK for All Star Wrestling. At the time, it was widely reported that he died of heart failure or a heart attack, but this was later found to be incorrect due to his lungs showing severe signs of fluid blockage.

Legacy 
The Yokozuna Memorial Show was held in Allentown, Pennsylvania in November 2001, shortly after the first anniversary of Anoaʻi's death. It was presented by the independent promotion World Xtreme Wrestling, although matches included wrestlers from multiple promotions.

On March 31, 2012, Yokozuna was inducted into the WWE Hall of Fame by his cousins, The Usos and Rikishi.

Championships and accomplishments 

 Pro Wrestling Illustrated
 Most Improved Wrestler of the Year (1993)
 PWI ranked him #5 of the 500 best singles wrestlers in the PWI 500 in 1993
 PWI ranked him #145 of the 500 best singles wrestlers during the "PWI Years" in 2003
 Universal Wrestling Association
 UWA World Trios Championship (1 time) – with Fatu and Samoan Savage
 World Wrestling Federation/WWE
 WWF Championship (2 times)
 WWF Tag Team Championship (2 times) – with Owen Hart
 Royal Rumble (1993)
 WWE Hall of Fame (Class of 2012)

See also
 List of premature professional wrestling deaths

References

External links 
 
 
 
 

1966 births
2000 deaths
20th-century American male actors
20th-century professional wrestlers
American male professional wrestlers
American people of Samoan descent
American professional wrestlers of Samoan descent
Anoa'i family
Deaths from pulmonary edema
Faux Japanese professional wrestlers
Fictional sumo wrestlers
Professional wrestlers from California
Sportspeople from San Francisco
UWA World Trios Champions
WWE Hall of Fame inductees
WWE Champions